Provincial Trunk Highway 44 (PTH 44) is a provincial highway in the Canadian province of Manitoba.

It begins at Highway 9 near Lockport, north of Winnipeg. PTH 44 ends at the Trans-Canada Highway near the Ontario boundary. It is a substandard highway through Whiteshell Park, more comparable to a Provincial Road with little to no shoulder and an uneven driving surface.

History
PTH 44 was originally part of Highway 1.  When the new Highway 1 route was completed as part of the Trans-Canada Highway project in 1958, this section became part of transprovincial Highway 4 (along with current Highways 9, 16, and 26).  The highway was renumbered to its current designation in 1968.

Major intersections

References

044
Former segments of the Trans-Canada Highway